Kenny Mainor (born October 30, 1985) is a Canadian football defensive linemen who is a free agent. He has also been a player for the Winnipeg Blue Bombers of the Canadian Football League (CFL). He played college football at Troy University. He was signed by the New York Giants as an undrafted free agent in 2009.

References

External links
Troy Trojans bio
Just Sports Stats

1985 births
Living people
African-American players of Canadian football
American players of Canadian football
Canadian football defensive linemen
Winnipeg Blue Bombers players
Troy Trojans football players
Alabama Hammers players
21st-century African-American sportspeople
20th-century African-American people